Ascosphaera is a genus of fungi in the family Ascosphaeraceae. It was described in 1955 by mycologists Charles F. Spiltoir and Lindsay S. Olive. Members of the genus are insect pathogens. The type species, A. apis, causes chalkbrood disease in honey bees. The reproductive ascospores of the fungus are produced within a unique structure, the spore cyst, or sporocyst.

Species
A. acerosa
A. aggregata
A. apis
A. asterophora
A. atra
A. callicarpa
A. celerrima
A. cinnamomea
A. duoformis
A. fimicola
A. flava
A. fusiformis
A. larvis
A. major
A. naganensis
A. osmophila
A. parasitica
A. pollenicola
A. proliperda
A. scaccaria
A. solina
A. subcuticularis
A. tenax
A. torchioi
A. variegata
A. verrucosa
A. xerophila

References

External links

Onygenales
Eurotiomycetes genera
Taxa described in 1955